The 1975 European Amateur Team Championship took place 28 June – 1 July at Killarney Golf & Fishing Club, Killarney, Ireland. It was the ninth men's golf European Amateur Team Championship.

Venue 

The course was set up with par 35 over the first nine holes and par 38 on the second nine, finishing with a par 3 hole.

The course was dry and the whether warm and sunny during the whole tournament.

Format 
All participating teams played one qualification round of stroke-play with six players, counted the five best scores for each team.

The eight best teams formed flight A, in knock-out match-play over the next three days. The teams were seeded based on their positions after the stroke play. The first placed team were drawn to play the quarter final against the eight placed team, the second against the seventh, the third against the sixth and the fourth against the fifth. In each match between two nation teams, two 18-hole foursome games and five 18-hole single games were played. Teams were allowed to use six players during the team matches, selecting four of them in the morning foursome matches and five players in to the afternoon single matches. Games all square at the 18th hole were declared halved, if the team match was already decided.

The six teams placed 9–14 in the qualification stroke-play formed Flight B and the four teams placed 15–18 formed Flight C, to play similar knock-out play to decide their final positions.

Teams 
18 nation teams contested the event. Each team consisted of six players.

Winners 
Scotland won the gold medal, earning their first title, beating Italy in the final 4.5–2.5. The Scottish team won the qualifying competition for the fourth consecutive occasion and had previously in the history of the championship finished second three times, losing the last two finals to England.

Team Sweden, earned the bronze on third place, just as at the previous event two years earlier, after beating  Switzerland 4–3 in the bronze match.

Defending champions England did not make it to the quarter-finals, finishing tied 8th in the qualifying competition and losing the tie-breaker to France with a one stroke higher non-counting sixth score. Team Wales' low scorer Jeff Toye holed from eight feet on both of his last two greens, giving his team a final one-stroke advantage over England and France, but the sixth score for Wales would not have beaten the sixth scores of neither England or France in the event of a tie.

Individual leader in the opening 18-hole stroke-play qualifying competition was Ian Hutcheon, Scotland, with a score of 3-under-par 70. There was no official award for the lowest individual score.

Results 
Qualification round

Team standings

* Note: In the event of a tie the order was determined by the better non-counting score.

Individual leaders

 Note: There was no official award for the lowest individual score.

Sources:

Flight A

Bracket

Final games

* Note: Game declared halved, since team match already decided.

Flight B

Elimination matches

Match for 13th place

Match for 11th place

Match for 9th place

Flight C

First round

Second round

Third round

Final standings

Sources:

See also 

 Eisenhower Trophy – biennial world amateur team golf championship for men organized by the International Golf Federation.
 European Ladies' Team Championship – European amateur team golf championship for women organised by the European Golf Association.

References

External links 

 European Golf Association: Full results

European Amateur Team Championship
Golf tournaments in Ireland
European Amateur Team Championship
European Amateur Team Championship
European Amateur Team Championship